The thirty-ninth Connecticut House of Representatives district elects one member of the Connecticut House of Representatives. Its current representative is Democrat Anthony Nolan. The district consists of part of the city of New London, which is divided between the 39th and 40th districts.

List of representatives

Recent elections

External links 
 Google Maps - Connecticut House Districts
 Ballotpedia - Connecticut House of Representatives District 39

References

39
New London, Connecticut